The Aviatik (Berg) D.II, the prototypes of which were known as Aviatik 30.22 and Aviatik 30.38, was an Austro-Hungarian sesquiplane fighter aircraft prototype towards the end of the First World War.

Development
The D.II's fuselage was virtually identical to that of the D.I. It was characterised, however, by its short-span cantilever lower wing, which made it a sesquiplane. Through 1917, 19 D.IIs were built for front-line evaluation. The series 39 aircraft were powered by the  Austro-Daimler 200hp engine and the series 339 aircraft by the  Austro-Daimler 225 hp engine driving a four-bladed Jaray propeller and armed with the usual paired  Schwarzlose machine guns. A further prototype, (30.38), was produced by fitting a  Hiero engine in a D.II airframe.

Operational history
The first three production aircraft were tested in November 1917, and seven were evaluated at the front later in that year, showing good promise. However, the decision was made that Aviatik should instead produce the Fokker D.VII, and any plans to continue production of the D.II were halted.

Operators

Austro-Hungarian Imperial and Royal Aviation Troops

Yugoslav Royal Air Force - Postwar

Specifications (D.II series 39)

References

Citations

Bibliography

 

1910s Austro-Hungarian fighter aircraft
D.II
Sesquiplanes
Single-engined tractor aircraft
Aircraft first flown in 1917